Peru Community Church, also known as Peru Congregational Church, is a historic church located in Peru, Clinton County, New York.  It was built in 1833, and is a rectangular sandstone Gothic Revival style church.  It has a gable roof and center entrance tower with pointed arched openings, belfry, and wood frame steeple.  A two-story social hall was added in 1949.

It was added to the National Register of Historic Places in 2001.

References

External links
church website

Congregational churches in New York (state)
Churches on the National Register of Historic Places in New York (state)
Gothic Revival church buildings in New York (state)
Churches completed in 1833
Churches in Clinton County, New York
National Register of Historic Places in Clinton County, New York